Peter (Harmer) Lovesey (born 1936), also known by his pen name Peter Lear, is a British writer of historical and contemporary detective novels and short stories.  His best-known series characters are Sergeant Cribb, a Victorian-era police detective based in London, and Peter Diamond, a modern-day police detective in Bath.

Early life
Lovesey was born in Middlesex, England, and attended Hampton Grammar School. He went to Reading University in 1955 but since he did not have the requisite Latin qualification, he chose a degree in Fine Art which included History and English as elective subjects. Two of his English tutors, John Wain (1925–94) and Frank Kermode (1919–2010), thought well enough of Lovesey's essays to get him into the English course after all.

He graduated from Reading with an honours degree in 1958; he then did three years of National Service in the Royal Air Force. Signing up for the third year – National Service was ordinarily for two years – enabled him to train, and obtain better pay, as an Education Officer. When he left the Air Force it also gave him an edge in starting his teaching career. He married Jacqueline (Jax) Lewis, whom he had met at Reading, in 1959.

Teaching and writing career
Lovesey's career in education lasted fourteen years. He started as a Lecturer in English at Thurrock Technical College in Essex, 1961; he then became Head of the General Education Department at London’s Hammersmith College for Further Education (now West London College). He quit teaching to become a full-time writer in 1975.

Lovesey has written that he entered into writing detective fiction by way of his interest in British sports history.  His first detective novel, Wobble to Death (1970), was set within a historically accurate depiction of a 19th century foot race.  Lovesey has also authored non-fiction works on the history of British athletics.  His first novel was followed by seven others in the Sergeant Cribb series set in Victorian England with the stories often placed in sport or entertainment events such as boxing, rowing, and music hall.  After the Cribb series concluded, Lovesey continued with standalone and series mysteries, mostly set in various historical periods.  From 1991, he switched to contemporary crime fiction with the Peter Diamond series set in modern-day Bath and consisting of twenty titles as of 2022.

Peter Lovesey lives near Chichester. His son Phil Lovesey also writes crime novels. His son was born in 1963 and worked as an English teacher at Wolverhampton Grammar School until the end of the autumn 2012.
His daughter, Kathy Lovesey, was born in 1960, and now lives with her family in Greenwich, Connecticut.

Awards
Peter Lovesey has won awards for his fiction, including Gold and Silver Daggers from the British Crime Writers' Association, the Cartier Diamond Dagger for Lifetime Achievement, the French Grand Prix de Littérature Policière and first place in the Mystery Writers of America's 50th Anniversary Short Story Contest.   In 2016, the UK's Detection Club published Motives for Murder (US: Crippen & Landru, UK: Sphere) to recognise Lovesey's 80th birthday. In 2019, he was recognised by the Bouchercon Convention in Dallas for Lifetime Achievement.

Bibliography
Lovesey's novels and stories mainly fall into the category of entertaining puzzlers in the "Golden Age" tradition of mystery writing.

Most of Peter Lovesey's writing has been done under his own name. However, he did write three novels under the pen name Peter Lear.

Sergeant Cribb novels
Novels featuring Victorian era detective Sergeant Daniel Cribb and his assistant Constable Thackeray.
Wobble to Death (1970), 
The Detective Wore Silk Drawers (1971), 
Abracadaver (1972), 
Mad Hatter's Holiday (1973), 
Invitation to a Dynamite Party (1974),  (published in the US as The Tick of Death)
A Case of Spirits (1975), 
Swing, Swing Together (1976), 
Waxwork (1978),  (Silver Dagger Award)

Adaptations
The novels were adapted into a Granada TV Series simply entitled Cribb (1979–81). The Series starred Alan Dobie as Cribb, with William Simons as Thackeray. The series is available on DVD in the UK, the US, and Canada.

BBC Radio's Saturday Night Theatre adapted six of the novels:
 Abracadaver (1975), with Frank Windsor as Cribb & John Hollis as Thackeray.
 Wobble to Death (1975), with Timothy Bateson as Cribb & William Eedle as Thackeray.
 The Detective Wore Silk Drawers (1977), with John Rye as Cribb & John Hollis as Thackeray.
 A Case of Spirits (1985), with Barry Foster as Cribb & John Cater as Thackeray.
 Swing, Swing Together (1987), with Barry Foster as Cribb & John Cater as Thackeray.
 Waxwork (1987), with Brian Cox as Cribb & John Cater as Thackeray.

Peter Diamond novels
The Last Detective (1991),  (Anthony Award)
Diamond Solitaire (1992), 
The Summons (1995),  (Silver Dagger Award)
Bloodhounds (1996),  (Silver Dagger Award, Macavity Award, Barry Award)
Upon a Dark Night (1997), 
The Vault (1999), 
Diamond Dust (2002), 
The House Sitter (2003),  (with Inspector Henrietta Mallin) (Macavity Award)
The Secret Hangman (2007), 
Skeleton Hill (2009), 
Stagestruck (2011), 
Cop to Corpse (2012), 
The Tooth Tattoo (2013), 
The Stone Wife (2014), 
Down Among the Dead Men (2015), 
Another One Goes Tonight (2016), 
Beau Death (2017), 
Killing With Confetti (2019), 
The Finisher (2020), 
Diamond and the Eye (2021), 
Showstopper (2022),

Albert Edward, Prince of Wales novels
Bertie and the Tinman (1987), 
Bertie and the Seven Bodies (1990), 
Bertie and the Crime of Passion (1993),

Novels as Peter Lear
Goldengirl (1977), 
Spider Girl (1980),  (republished as In Suspense)
The Secret of Spandau (1986),

Other novels
The False Inspector Dew (1982),  (Gold Dagger Award)
Keystone (1983), 
Rough Cider (1986), 
On the Edge (1989),  (adapted for television as Dead Gorgeous in 2002)
The Reaper (2000), 
The Circle (2005),  (Inspector Hen Mallin, appearance by Peter Diamond)
The Headhunters (2008), (Inspector Hen Mallin)

Short story collections
Butchers (1985), 
The Crime of Miss Oyster Brown (1994), 
Do Not Exceed the Stated Dose (Crippen & Landru,1998), 
The Sedgemoor Strangler (Crippen & Landru, 2001), 
Murder on the Short List (Crippen & Landru, 2008), 
"Showman" in Past Poisons (1998)
"Lovesey's New Shorts" to be published in 2021

Anthology
The Black Cabinet (1989),  (ed.)
The Verdict of Us All (2006),  (ed.)

Non-fiction
The Kings of Distance (1968)
The Guide to British Track and Field Literature, 1275–1968 (1969),  (with Tom McNab)
The Official Centenary History of the Amateur Athletic Association (1979), 
An Athletics Compendium (2001),  (with Tom McNab and Andrew Huxtable)

References

External links
 
 SOHO Press Author Page
Interview with Peter Lovesey, Speaking of Mysteries TV Series (2001)

1936 births
Living people
People educated at Hampton School
English crime fiction writers
English short story writers
Cartier Diamond Dagger winners
Members of the Detection Club
People from Whitton, London
Anthony Award winners
Macavity Award winners
Barry Award winners
20th-century English novelists
21st-century British novelists
Writers of historical mysteries
English male short story writers
English male novelists
20th-century British short story writers
21st-century British short story writers
20th-century English male writers
21st-century English male writers